Baoji University of Arts and Sciences is a University set in Baoji, Shaanxi, China.

External links 

 

Universities and colleges in Shaanxi
1958 establishments in China
Educational institutions established in 1958